The Centinel of the Northwest Territory, published in Cincinnati by William Maxwell, was the first newspaper in the Northwest Territory. It appeared November 9, 1793, and weekly thereafter until June 1796, when it was sold to Edmund Freeman and was merged with Freeman's Journal. Subscription was "250 cents" per annum, and 7 cents a single copy. The motto of the Centinel: "Open to all Parties -- but influenced by none," expressed the publisher's aims: to afford an isolated community a medium to make known its varied wants and to record local happenings, as well as those of the outside world. 

Around 1800, the paper moved to Chillicothe, Ohio, when the government of the Northwest Territory relocated to that city.  The paper eventually assumed the name The Chillicothe Gazette and continues as Ohio's oldest newspaper. A complete file is in the library of the Ohio Historical Society in Cincinnati.

Sources

Defunct newspapers published in Cincinnati
Northwest Territory
Publications established in 1793
Publications disestablished in 1796